Dendrochilum magnum is a species of orchid, commonly known as the large dendrochilum, endemic to Philippines.

magnum